The Compton Limestone is a geologic formation in southwest Missouri. It preserves brachiopod and echinoderm fossils of the Mississippian subperiod. The Compton rests unconformably on the Cotter Dolomite of Ordovician age. The Compton was named for the community of Compton, Missouri as the type sections were described for outcrops along the James River and its tributary the Compton Branch.

See also

 List of fossiliferous stratigraphic units in Missouri
 Paleontology in Missouri

References

 

Mississippian Missouri
Carboniferous southern paleotemperate deposits